Josef Šimoník (30 August 1941, Vrahovice – 14 September 2006, Zlín) was a Czech chemist. He has specialized in polymers.

References

Czech chemists
1941 births
2006 deaths
People from Prostějov